Khorassania hartigi is a species of snout moth in the genus Khorassania. It was described by Hans Georg Amsel in 1951. It is found in Iran.

References

Moths described in 1951
Phycitini
Taxa named by Hans Georg Amsel